HBMS may refer to:

 Handsome Boy Modeling School, a hip-hop duo
 His Britannic Majesty's Ship, an obsolete title for Royal Navy warships.
 Hollis Brookline Middle School